The Mount Sinai gecko (Hemidactylus mindiae) is a species of lizard in the family Gekkonidae. The species is endemic to Egypt.

Habitat
The natural habitats of H. mindiae are rocky areas, caves, rural gardens, and urban areas.

Conservation status
The Mount Sinai gecko is threatened by habitat loss.

Etymology
The specific epithet, mindiae, commemorates the late Mindy Baha El Din, an environmentalist and herpetologist from Egypt. She was the wife of Sherif Baha El Din, also a herpetologist, who described this lizard as a new species.

References

Further reading
Baha El Din, Sherif M. (2005). "An overview of Egyptian species of Hemidactylus (Gekkonidae), with the description of a new species from the high mountains of South Sinai". Zoology in the Middle East 34: 11–26. (Hemidactylus mindiae, new species). (in English, plus abstract in German).

External links

Hemidactylus
Endemic fauna of Egypt
Vertebrates of Egypt
Geckos of Africa
Reptiles described in 2005
Taxonomy articles created by Polbot